Frank Martínez was a Puerto Rican lawyer, politician and senator.

In 1917, Martínez was elected as a member of the first Puerto Rican Senate established by the Jones-Shafroth Act. He was elected as a Senator at-large.

Education
Upon completing his primary education at the school of that city, he attended the University of Barcelona, in Spain, from which he graduated with the title of Bachelor of Arts in 1901. For his profession in life Mr. Martinez chose the law and in 1902 he entered Cornell Law School, in Ithaca, New York, and graduated from this university in 1906, obtaining the degree of Bachelor of Laws. The same year he was admitted to the New York State Bar.

Death
Frank Martinez died on July 1, 1966 at age 81. He was buried at Buxeda Memorial Park in Río Piedras, Puerto Rico.

References

1884 births
1966 deaths
Cornell Law School alumni
Members of the Senate of Puerto Rico
People from Mayagüez, Puerto Rico
University of Barcelona alumni